Battle of Cartagena may refer to:
 Battle of Cartagena (209 BC), Roman assault on Carthaginian town in Iberia
 Battle of Cartagena (206 BC), Carthaginian failed attempt to retake the city
 Battle of Cartagena (461), a naval battle near the Iberian town between Vandals and Romans during the Wars of Majorian
 Battle of Cartagena (1643), a naval battle between France and Spain near the Spanish port during the Catalan Revolt
 Battle of Cartagena de Indias (1741), the third failed British siege of the Colombian port during the War of Jenkins' Ear
 Battle of Cartagena (1758), a naval battle between Britain and France near the Spanish port during the Seven Years' War